The 2018 season was Negeri Sembilan's 95th season in club history and 9th season in Malaysia Super League since it was first introduced in 2004. Also it was the first season in the Malaysia Super League since promoted of the Malaysia Premier League in 2017 season.

Club

Coaching staff

Kit manufacturers and financial sponsor

Player information

Full squad

Transfers

1st leg
In

Out

2nd leg
In

Out

Non-competitive

Pre-season

Cambodia Pre-season Tour 2018

Competitions

Malaysia Super League

League table

Results by matchday

Matches

Malaysia FA Cup

Malaysia Challenge Cup

Group stage

Statistics

Squad appearances

Top scorers

Top assists

Clean sheets

Disciplinary record 

'' = Number of bookings;    = Number of sending offs after a second yellow card;    = Number of sending offs by a direct red card.

References

External links

Negeri Sembilan FA seasons
Malaysian football clubs 2018 season